SS San Flaviano was a British oil tanker owned by Eagle Oil and Shipping Company, a British subsidiary of Royal Dutch Shell. She was built by Cammell Laird in England in 1956 and attacked and sunk by the CIA in Borneo in 1958.

San Flaviano had a sister ship, built by Cammell Laird in the same year. The two ships were part of a substantial investment programme to renew Eagle Oil's fleet with larger and more modern tankers. Between 1950 and 1960 the company took delivery of at least 16 new tankers.

Building
Cammell Laird built San Flaviano as yard number 1242. She was launched on 12 June 1956 and completed that September.

San Flaviano was a steamship. A pair of steam turbines drove her single screw.

Eagle Oil registered San Flaviano in London. Her UK official number was 187459, which later became the IMO number 1187459.

Bombed and sunk by the CIA

San Flavianos career was cut short in 1958. On 28 April San Flaviano was in Balikpapan Harbour, in the East Kalimantan Province of Borneo, when a Douglas B-26 Invader bomber aircraft, flown by the CIA and painted black and with no markings, bombed and sank her.

San Flaviano had nearly finished discharging a cargo of crude oil, leaving her tanks full of highly flammable gas. The CIA aircraft hit San Flaviano with one or more 500-pound (227-kg) bombs amidships on her starboard side. Fire and explosions spread rapidly along that side of the ship, either destroying her starboard lifeboats or making them inaccessible. Nevertheless, her officers and crew launched both port lifeboats within four minutes, successfully evacuating everyone including a passenger, the Chief Officer's wife. San Flaviano sank near the entrance of Balikpapan harbour.

In response, Royal Dutch Shell suspended its tanker service to Balikpapan and evacuated shore-based wives and families to Singapore. Most of San Flavianos complement were also evacuated to Singapore, travelling on two oil tankers of Anglo-Saxon Petroleum, another of Royal Dutch Shell's British subsidiaries.

In June 1958 both the Indonesian and UK governments claimed that the aircraft had been flown by Indonesian rebels. In fact only the radio operator was from the Permesta rebels in North Sulawesi. The B-26, its  bombs and its pilot, former United States Army Air Forces officer William H. Beale, were sent by the CIA as part of US covert support for the rebellion. The CIA pilots had orders to target commercial shipping to drive foreign merchant ships away from Indonesian waters, thereby weakening the Indonesian economy and destabilising the Indonesian government of President Sukarno. Shell's suspension of operations and partial evacuation of personnel was exactly what the CIA attack was intended to achieve.

For some months previously, UK Prime Minister Harold Macmillan and Foreign Secretary Selwyn Lloyd had supported US policy to aid Permesta. On 6 May 1958, more than a week after the CIA sank San Flaviano, Lloyd secretly told US Secretary of State John Foster Dulles that this was still his position. On 18 May, Indonesian forces shot down a different Permesta B-26 and captured its CIA pilot, Allen Pope. Nevertheless, in June 1958 both Indonesia and the UK publicly claimed that the aircraft had been flown by Indonesian rebels, concealing the CIA involvement of which both governments were well aware.

See also
 – a British cargo ship napalmed by a CIA aircraft in Guatemala in 1954

References

Sources

1956 ships
Central Intelligence Agency operations
False flag operations
Guided Democracy in Indonesia
Maritime incidents in 1958
Maritime incidents in Indonesia
Ships built on the River Mersey
Shell plc
Ships sunk by US aircraft
Steam turbine-powered ships
Steamships of the United Kingdom